Korey Damont Stringer (May 8, 1974 – August 1, 2001) was an American professional football player who was an offensive tackle in the National Football League (NFL) for six seasons.  He played college football at the Ohio State University and was recognized as an All-American.  He was drafted in the first round of the 1995 NFL Draft by the Minnesota Vikings. On August 1, 2001, Stringer died from complications brought on by heat stroke during the Vikings' training camp in Mankato, Minnesota.

Early years
Stringer was born in Warren, Ohio. He attended Warren G. Harding High School in Warren, and was a member of the Harding Raiders high school football team.  The Raiders won the football state championship in 1990.

College career
Stringer decided to attend Ohio State University, where he played for the Ohio State Buckeyes football team from 1992 to 1994.  His Buckeyes teammates included offensive tackle Orlando Pace and running backs Eddie George and Robert Smith.  As a junior in 1994, he was recognized as a consensus first-team All-American.

Professional career
He was a standout on the offensive line, earning Pro Bowl honors in what turned out to be his final season in 2000. In six NFL seasons, he played in 93 regular season games and started 91 of them. As a professional player, Stringer was well-liked inside the locker room and out; after a Vikings game, he stopped to help a fan change a flat tire, and he impulsively signed over his Pro Bowl appearance check to a youth football program in his hometown of Warren.

Death at training camp
Stringer suffered from heat stroke on the second day of the Vikings 2001 preseason training camp and died on August 1, 2001 as a result of complications. He was unable to complete the first practice session, held the morning of July 30, due to exhaustion, and did not participate in that day's afternoon session, but he vowed to return the next day to complete the morning session, which was conducted in full pads. Although he vomited three times, he did complete the morning practice session on July 31, which lasted 2 hours, but walked to an air-conditioned shelter after the session, where he became weak and dizzy. Offensive line coach Mike Tice stated that he had not witnessed Stringer vomiting, and that Stringer did not exhibit any symptoms of heat-related illness.

When he was taken to Immanuel St. Joseph's–Mayo Health System hospital, his body temperature was  upon arrival. Stringer was unconscious from the time he was admitted until his death at 1:50 AM on August 1. An autopsy confirmed that Stringer died from organ failure resulting from heat stroke.

The Minnesota Occupational Safety and Health Administration (MNOSHA) investigated Stringer's death and cleared the Vikings of responsibility on November 1, 2001. The Vice President of the Vikings, Mike Kelly, met with MNOSHA officials along with the team's athletic trainer and equipment manager. However, under the governing labor laws, the Vikings would only be held liable if it was proven they were negligent or had inflicted intentional harm. Although the autopsy confirmed that Stringer was not taking supplements, the Vikings began preparing a defense to a planned lawsuit in November 2001 by announcing that Stringer's locker was full of dietary supplements, including some that contained ephedra.

Legacy
The Vikings retired his jersey number 77 on November 19, 2001, during the halftime of a Monday night game with the New York Giants in the  season.

Stringer's widow filed a wrongful death lawsuit against the team and trainers in February 2002. The trainers were granted summary judgment for immunity, which was upheld on initial appeal as well as a second appeal to the Supreme Court of Minnesota. Parts of her lawsuit were later thrown out; another suit against the NFL was filed in July 2003 and settled in January 2009. The only disclosed term of the settlement is that the NFL will support efforts to create a heat illness prevention program.  His widow also brought a lawsuit against Riddell Inc., the manufacturer of Stringer's pads and helmet.  In July 2009, a federal judge determined that Riddell had a duty to inform Stringer that their equipment could contribute to heat injuries.  A district court judge then ordered a jury trial regarding the matter.

Stringer's death brought about major changes regarding heat stroke prevention throughout the NFL. Many professional football teams now train in light color uniforms, water and shade are made readily available, and a team doctor is at practice sessions at all times.

Korey's wife Kelci worked to establish an exertional heat stroke prevention institute to honor her husband's legacy. On April 23, 2010 the NFL and Gatorade joined the University of Connecticut to announce the creation of the Korey Stringer Institute (KSI), a not-for-profit organization housed at the University of Connecticut dedicated to the prevention of sudden death in sports, with a focus on exertional heat stroke (EHS). KSI stems from the 2009 settlement, with Kelci Stringer teaming up with EHS expert, Dr. Douglas Casa, from the University of Connecticut, and the NFL. The mission of the Korey Stringer Institute is to provide research, education, advocacy and consultation to maximize performance, optimize safety and prevent sudden death for the athlete, warfighter and laborer.

On the 20th anniversary of his stroke, Korey’s brother, Kevin, said "Any time there is a major change in how society does things, it's typically because somebody died or got hurt in some way, shape or form, I guess Korey's death was my family's turn to pay that cost. It bothers me sometimes if I hear of somebody having a heat-related injury, but I know even if that happens, there is more awareness of what to do. It took a while to get there, but we did."

See also
List of sportspeople who died during their careers
Jordan McNair

References

External links
 
 Korey Stringer Institute

1974 births
2001 deaths
African-American players of American football
All-American college football players
American football offensive tackles
Deaths from hyperthermia
Minnesota Vikings players
National Conference Pro Bowl players
National Football League players with retired numbers
Ohio State Buckeyes football players
Sportspeople from Warren, Ohio
Players of American football from Ohio
Sports deaths in Minnesota
20th-century African-American sportspeople